4-HO-DPT (4-hydroxy-N,N-dipropyltryptamine, Deprocin) is a substituted tryptamine with psychedelic effects. It is the 4-hydroxyl analog of dipropyltryptamine (DPT).

In 2019, Chadeayne et al. solved the crystal structure of the fumarate salt of 4-HO-DPT. The authors describe the structure as follows: "The asymmetric unit contains one 4-HO-DPT cation, protonated at the dipropylamine N atom. There are also two independent water molecules, and half of a fumarate ion present."

See also
 4-AcO-DPT
 4-HO-EPT
 4-HO-PiPT
 UH-301

References

Tryptamines